Augusto da Silva Tomás is Angolan politician. He was Minister of Finance from May 1995 to March 1996. He was the Angolan minister for transport from 2008 to 2017. He was arrested on corruption charges in September 2018.

References 

Angolan politicians
Governors of Cabinda
Economy ministers of Angola
Finance ministers of Angola
Transports ministers of Angola
Living people
1957 births
MPLA politicians